The 2009 AdvoCare V100 Independence Bowl was the thirty-fourth edition of the college football bowl game, and was played at Independence Stadium in Shreveport, Louisiana.  The game started at 5:00 PM US EST on Monday, December 28, 2009. The game was telecast on ESPN2 and the Georgia Bulldogs defeated the Texas A&M Aggies by a score of 44-20.

The game was Georgia's second appearance in the bowl game. Their previous appearance in the game was a 24–15 victory over the University of Arkansas in 1991.

As for Texas A&M, the Aggies made their third appearance in the Independence Bowl and now hold an overall record of 1–2. Their last appearance resulted in a 43–41 overtime loss to Mississippi State on December 31, 2000, a game since nicknamed the "Snow Bowl" due to the unusual amount of snowfall Shreveport received that day. The entire game was played under extremely wintry conditions, a rarity for Shreveport.

The game was the fifth time that the two schools have faced each other in a game.  Texas A&M previously held the series advantage 3–1 (now 3-2). The last time, prior to the bowl that the two teams met was a 42–0 victory by Georgia in 1980. The two teams have played in a bowl game against each other once before, as they met in the 1950 Presidential Cup Bowl. The game, which was played in College Park, Maryland, was the only ever edition of the Presidential Cup Bowl, and Texas A&M was victorious by a score of 40–20.


Game summary
Georgia wore their home red jerseys, and Texas A&M wore their away white jerseys.

Georgia's quarterback, Joe Cox, threw for 157 yards and two touchdowns as the Bulldogs dominated Texas A&M to win their fourth straight bowl game.  Tight End Aron White caught both of Cox's touchdown passes, one from 24 yards out and the other a two-yard catch, on his way to being named the game's offensive MVP.  Caleb King paced the Bulldogs rushing game with 61 yards on 16 carries and two touchdowns.  Special teams also played a huge part in the Georgia victory.  The Bulldogs scored their first touchdown of the game on a kickoff return for a score.  Georgia also blocked a punt and a field goal attempt, and recovered a bad snap on a punt at the Texas A&M 24-yard line.  Aggies quarterback Jerrod Johnson passed for 360 yards and two touchdowns, but also threw two costly interceptions.  Jeff Fuller led A&M with 7 receptions for 101 yards in the losing effort.  Georgia's six touchdowns tied an Independence Bowl record. And Georgia's 30 second-half points established a new record for points scored in a half for the Independence Bowl.

Scoring summary

References

Independence Bowl
Independence Bowl
Georgia Bulldogs football bowl games
Texas A&M Aggies football bowl games
December 2009 sports events in the United States